Warragai Creek is a locality between the towns of Casino and Grafton on the Summerland Way in northern New South Wales, Australia. The North Coast railway passes nearby, and a now-closed railway station was provided where the Warragai Road crosses the railway from 1905.

References 

Towns in New South Wales
Northern Rivers